An endotransglucosylase is an enzyme which is able to transfer a saccharide unit from one saccharide to another.

References 

Carbohydrates
EC 3.2